The 2021 Pan American Aerobic Gymnastics Championships were held in Oaxtepec, Mexico, from December 10 to 13, 2021. The competition was approved by the International Gymnastics Federation.

Medalists

Senior

References

2021 in gymnastics
International gymnastics competitions hosted by Mexico
2021 in Mexican sports
Pan American Gymnastics Championships